The 21st constituency of the Nord is a French legislative constituency in the Nord département.

Description

Prior to 1988, the 21st constituency was the constituency of Avesnes-sur-Helpe in the southeastern part of the department. It now contains most of Valenciennes as well as some surrounding areas.

Long serving representative and former Minister of Economy, Finance and Industry Jean-Louis Borloo resigned from the seat in April 2014 due to ill health and was replaced by Mayor of Valenciennes Laurent Degallaix following a by-election.

Historic Representatives

Election results

2022

 
 
 
 
 
 
 
|-
| colspan="8" bgcolor="#E9E9E9"|
|-

2017

2014 by-election

 
 
 
 
 
 
|-
| colspan="8" bgcolor="#E9E9E9"|
|-

2012

 
 
 
 
|-
| colspan="8" bgcolor="#E9E9E9"|
|-

2007

2002

 
 
 
 
|-
| colspan="8" bgcolor="#E9E9E9"|
|-

1997

 
 
 
 
 
 
 
|-
| colspan="8" bgcolor="#E9E9E9"|
|-
 
 

 
 
 
 
 

* RPR dissident

1993

Sources
 Official results of French elections from 1998: 

21